The Alfred Joyce Kilmer Memorial Bad Poetry Contest has been hosted annually by the Philolexian Society, a literary and debating group at Columbia University, since 1986, drawing crowds of 200–300 students and participants vying for the title of best of the worst. Columbia faculty members serve as judges. The event is usually held in November and is heralded by the appearance of "Bad Poetry in Motion" flyers around campus (satirizing the New York City Subway's "Poetry in Motion" series) featuring some of the best verses of the last 20 years, as well as door-to-door readings in the dorms, usually performed by prospective new members ("phreshlings").

The event is named for "bad" poet (and Philolexian alumnus) Joyce Kilmer. His most famous work, Trees, is read aloud by audience members at the contest's end. In 2012, the Columbia Daily Spectator listed the Kilmer Bad Poetry Contest #1 among its "Best Columbia Arts Traditions".

The two top Kilmer laureates are Stephen Blair, Columbia College '11, who won the contest in 2008, 2012 and 2013; and Everett Patterson, Columbia College '06, who won in 2003 and 2005.

References

External links
WikiCU Joyce Kilmer Memorial Bad Poetry Contest
Columbia Spectator

Culture of Columbia University
Poetry awards